Jürgen Eberding (born 3 December 1955) is a German long-distance runner. He competed in the marathon at the 1980 Summer Olympics representing East Germany.

References

1955 births
Living people
People from Halberstadt
People from Bezirk Magdeburg
German male long-distance runners
German male marathon runners
Sportspeople from Saxony-Anhalt
Olympic athletes of East Germany
Athletes (track and field) at the 1980 Summer Olympics
20th-century German people